Vũ Thị Anh Thư (born 16 July 2001) is a Vietnamese badminton player. She won a silver medal in badminton at the 2018 Youth Olympics mixed team relay event. Vũ also helped the Vietnamese women's team to secure a bronze medal at the 2021 Southeast Asian Games when she delivered the last point for the team after defeating Ong Xin Yee of Malaysia.

Career 
Vũ started playing badminton at the age of 10. In 2011, she competed in the Vietnamese National Junior Badminton Championships and won a medal. 

In 2022, she won a bronze medal at the 2021 Southeast Asian Games women's team event. In the following months, she won her first international title at the Croatia Open. A few months later, she would win her second consecutive title at the Future Series Nouvelle-Aquitaine. In September, she reached the quarterfinals of the Vietnam Open.

Achievements

BWF International Challenge/Series (2 titles) 
Women's singles

  BWF International Challenge tournament
  BWF International Series tournament
  BWF Future Series tournament

BWF Junior International (1 runner-up) 
Girls' singles

  BWF Junior International Grand Prix tournament
  BWF Junior International Challenge tournament
  BWF Junior International Series tournament
  BWF Junior Future Series tournament

References

External links 

 

2001 births
Living people
21st-century Vietnamese women
Vietnamese female badminton players
Competitors at the 2021 Southeast Asian Games
Southeast Asian Games bronze medalists for Vietnam
Southeast Asian Games medalists in badminton
Badminton players at the 2018 Summer Youth Olympics